Bamf , originally Bampf, is an onomatopoeic term originating in comic books published by Marvel Comics, in particular those featuring the superhero Nightcrawler of the X-Men. The term is derived from the sound Nightcrawler makes when teleporting.

Sound
The "Bamf" sound is caused by air rushing into the space where Nightcrawler's body once was after he has teleported. It has been borrowed as a teleport sound by fans and a generic term for teleporting in general ("...and then he bamfed out..."). The sound has become a standard in pop culture.

Race

Bamfs are also a race of creatures described as small imp-like versions of Nightcrawler, which accompany him wherever he goes. They first appeared in the first Nightcrawler miniseries in 1985, and became a regular fixture of X-Men comics in the early 2010s.

Earth-5311
In Uncanny X-Men #153, Kitty Pryde tells a fairy tale to six-year-old Illyana Rasputin, which includes a race of creatures called "Bamfs", described as small imp-like versions of Nightcrawler, even wearing identical costumes. A Bamf enters the story after catching sight of Pirate Kitty, on whom he developed an instant crush, when she and her entourage landed on Bamf Island. He subsequently joins her team and aids in taking down Princess Jean (the fairy tale equivalent of Jean Grey), aka Dark Phoenix.

Earth-616
Late, in the first Nightcrawler limited series in 1985, Nightcrawler is sent to another universe that is identical to Kitty's fairy tale, where he encounters the Bamfs, including the heroic Bamf from Kitty's tale. Nightcrawler discovers that female Bamfs differ from the males in that they are taller, resembling female versions of himself. The male Bamfs are lecherous, flirtatious, and skirt-chasing, making them rather tiring company in the presence of attractive females.

At various times since Kitty's fairy tale, plush versions of Nightcrawler, also called "Bamfs", had appeared in many issues of Uncanny X-Men. Kitty Pryde, Illyana Rasputin, Jubilation Lee, and Amanda Sefton have been shown owning Bamf dolls. One issue of Avengers in the '90s showed Deathcry cuddling a Bamf doll.

In the early 2010s, the Bamfs reappeared at the newly opened Jean Grey School of Higher Learning, infesting the school after Vice-Principal Beast accidentally opened a portal to their home reality on the first day of school. Headmaster Wolverine is the head of a "Bamf Hunting Club". In this variation, the Bamfs are mute, naked, seemingly self-aware troublemakers who are depicted defacing school property in various ways. However, it later becomes uncertain whether the creatures infesting the school are Bamfs at all, an alien zoologist commenting that although the staff believe them to be "interdimensional gremlins" (i.e., Bamfs), they actually are not. The character is about to reveal what he believes to be the nature of the Bamfs when he is cut off, leaving the revelation for a later date; it is to note, however, that the Bamfs in this instance look more like the real Nightcrawler and sport body markings similar to his live action movie incarnation.

The Bamfs also helped Doop and Krakoa fight off Swarm when he attacked the Jean Grey School for Higher Learning.

Bamfs were eventually revealed to be creatures born in the depths of Hell. Their mother is a giant maggot, and their father is a changeling in the form of a face-eating lamprey. As soon as they were born, they were left on the brimstone plains to die. Against all odds, they survived as scavengers, as things lower than the lowest beast of the Pit until they were found by Azazel during one of his raids on Hell.

The Bamfs were starving, and so Azazel fed them his blood which in turn changed them and remade them in his image. Now with a legion of soldiers bound to his evil will, Azazel used them to raid Heaven for souls, but one of them was left behind and was found by Nightcrawler who made him a deal of his own which yet again changed them from red to blue. When questioned by Firestar about the deal, Nightcrawler only reveals that it wasn't his blood that he promised them but it was something his father could never match.

The details of the deal are revealed when Kurt uses the Bamfs and his connection to Azazel to restore himself to life back on Earth, thus preventing Azazel from attacking Heaven again by tying them both together, although this results in Kurt sacrificing his own soul to ensure that Azazel will not be able to return to Heaven. Henceforth, the Bamfs enlisted by Nightcrawler continue to keep him company on Earth.

Known Bamfs
 Chuckles – A Bamf that Wolverine named after Professor X.
 Pickles – A Bamf that lived in the past Beast's van.

References

External links
 Bamfs at Marvel Wiki
 Bamfs at Comic Vine
 Bamfs. The Comic Book Database.

Onomatopoeia
Characters created by Chris Claremont
Characters created by Dave Cockrum